The EuroBasket 2022 Final was the championship game of the EuroBasket 2022 tournament. The game took place on 18 September 2022 in the Mercedes-Benz Arena, Berlin.

The game featured Spain and France and was a re-match of the EuroBasket 2011 Final in Kaunas, when Spain won convincingly. 

Spain won the game, achieving their fourth Eurobasket title in the last six tournaments.

Road to the final

Match details

Rosters

Spain

France

References

2022 in Berlin
Final
2022
International basketball competitions hosted by Germany
Sports competitions in Berlin
Spain national basketball team games
September 2022 sports events in Germany
France national basketball team games